Souls Protest is a 2000 North Korean film directed by Kim Chun-song. The film is an epic dramatisation of the Ukishima Maru incident in which hundreds of Koreans were killed when the ship was sunk by a mysterious explosion, and supports the Korean view that the explosion was deliberately set off by the ship's Japanese crew. It has been dubbed as "Korea's Titanic".

Souls Protest was imported to South Korea by Narai Film, a Seoul-based film trader, and was approved for release after five minutes of footage was cut which showed jubilant Koreans crediting Kim Il-sung with liberating Korea from Japanese colonial rule. The film was shown intact, however, for its Seoul premiere on 24 August 2001, the 56th anniversary of the incident. One survivor of the incident, Lee Chul-woo, said of the film: "I didn't like the propaganda stuff about Kim Il Sung... But the scene about the explosion was so real, and it is laudable for North Korea to make a movie about this incident."

Souls Protest was later screened at the 2003 Jeonju International Film Festival.

Notes

References

 "Korean Titanic Amazes Moscow And Hong Kong Audience; To Be Exported to West" . People's Korea, 25 July 2001. Retrieved on 27 October 2008.
 Rajpal, Minita. "North Korean Film Inspires Emotions, Questions" . CNN.com, 7 September 2001. Retrieved on 27 October 2008.
 Cho, Grace M.. "Voices from the teum: Synesthetic truma and the ghosts of the Korean diaspora". The Affective Turn, pp. 151–169. Duke University Press, 2007. .

External links
 

2000 films
Films based on actual events
2000s Korean-language films
North Korean drama films
Anti-Japanese sentiment in Korea